Swargadwari is a municipality located in Pyuthan District of Lumbini Province of Nepal. The municipality was established on 10 March 2017 merging the former Kochibang, Swargadwarikhal, Bhingri, Sari, Belbas, Barjibang and Gothibang The municipality is divided into 9 wards and the headquarter (admin centre) of the municipality declared at Bhingri. The municipality spans   of area, with a total population of 30,940 individuals according to a 2011 Nepal census.

References

External links
official website of the rural municipality

Municipalities in Pyuthan District
Nepal municipalities established in 2017